Tire Rack was a privately owned customer-direct tire, wheels, car accessories distributor company headquartered in South Bend, Indiana until it was acquired by Discount Tire in 2021 and continued to operate Tire Rack as a separate business and brand name.

History
In 1979, automotive parts and service business owner Peter "Pete" Veldman came up with his business idea for the Tire Rack after his son-in-law Mike Joines was frustrated when he couldn't find tires for his Opel Manta sports coupe. Mike recommended that they start a mail-order tire company that stocked a few of every tire. Although Pete convinced Mike to help him open a retail store instead, they had so many phone orders that they eventually shut down the retail location and opened more phone lines. Three years after opening the store, Tire Rack got into the mail order business and by 1990 the store was shut down.

In 1995, Tire Rack began its website where it posted reviews of tires it sold. In 1998, Tire Rack began online sales. Since 1995, Tire Rack has been the title sponsor of the National Sports Car Club of America (SCCA) Solo Program, a club that allows driving enthusiasts to compete at a local level.

By 2005, Tire Rack had grown into a nationwide company that distributes more than 2 million tires annually. The company now offers 24 tire brands and has ten warehouses in nine states. Customers who pick up orders from a warehouse location are offered a discount.

After 26 years of being a privately-owned family company, Los Angeles-based investment group Leonard Green & Partners took a 49% stake in the company with the Veldman family controlling the majority 51%.

Pete Veldman passed away on March 14, 2014 at the age of 87. Pete's son-in-law Mike Joines succeeded him as president.

On December 4, 2021, Discount Tire acquired Tire Rack for an undisclosed amount.

References

External links 
 Tirerack.com (Official Website)
 DiscountTire.com (Official Website)

American companies established in 1979
Retail companies established in 1979
Online automotive companies of the United States
Automotive part retailers of the United States
1979 establishments in Indiana